Adam Joseph Duhe Jr. (born November 27, 1955) is a former American football defensive end who played eight seasons for the Miami Dolphins from 1977 to 1984 in the National Football League (NFL).

Early life
Born in Reserve, Louisiana, Duhe played football at Leon Godchaux High School on offense and defense, earning selections for All-District on both sides in his senior year, with him serving as defensive end and punter. He enrolled at Louisiana State University and starred as defensive tackle for the Tigers with an All-SEC and All-Academic honors.

Career
He was drafted in the first round of the 1977 NFL Draft by the Miami Dolphins. He was the AP NFL Defensive Rookie of the Year in his rookie year; unofficially, in his rookie year at Miami, he recorded seven sacks while recording 83 tackles. He was a one-time Pro Bowler, in 1984.

He switched from Defensive End to Inside Linebacker in 1980. In the 1982 AFC Championship game, Duhe intercepted Richard Todd three times as the Dolphins defeated the New York Jets 14–0. He returned the third interception 35 yards for a touchdown in the fourth quarter to seal Miami's trip to Super Bowl XVII.

His last season saw the Dolphins reach Super Bowl XIX (with him starting eight games and playing in four others due to grueling workouts from him), but he played for only a small portion due to a knee problem that left him unable to move laterally and a shoulder with diminished hitting capacity. By the time he was 29, he had already gone through four surgeries for problems with torn ligaments and shoulders.

In August of 1985, the Dolphins placed him on medical wavers and released (which meant he received just over twenty percent of his planned $275,000 salary).

Personal life and honors
Duhe also has done work as an actor. Duhe was inducted into the Louisiana Sports Hall of Fame in 2001 and the Greater New Orleans Sports Hall of Fame in 2018. As of that year, he was working for Caesars Entertainment while residing in Fort Lauderdale with his wife, with whom he has three children.

References

External links
 
 

1955 births
Living people
Players of American football from New Orleans
American football linebackers
LSU Tigers football players
Miami Dolphins players
National Football League Defensive Rookie of the Year Award winners
American Conference Pro Bowl players
Rhein Fire coaches
People from St. John the Baptist Parish, Louisiana